The father–son rule is a rule that allows clubs preferential recruiting access to the sons of players who have made a major past contribution to the club in Australian rules football, most notably in the Australian Football League. 

The rule was first established in 1949, and there have been more than ten amendments, most recently the refining of the draft bidding process in 2015.

History
The father–son rule was established during the 1949 season, allowing a player to be recruited by the club his father had played for, despite being residentially zoned to another club. The first player officially cleared under the father–son rule was Harvey Dunn Jr, who was recruited to his father's old club, Carlton, in 1951, instead of being zoned to North Melbourne.

The original rule is thought to have originally come into place as a result of successful lobbying by the Melbourne Football Club, which had wanted the young Ron Barassi to follow in the footsteps of his father, Ron Barassi Sr., who had been killed during World War II. Barassi was officially cleared to Melbourne under the rule in 1953.

Incorporation into the National Draft
Prior to 1997, the rule allowed the son to be recruited by his father's club, bypassing the draft entirely. West Coast's Ben Cousins, for example, was recruited in this manner, without the Eagles parting with any draft picks. In 1997, the father–son rule was altered to force clubs to use a second-round draft selection for their first father–son selection. If two players were to be drafted by the same club in the same year, then a third round selection was used for the second player. Geelong used this rule in 1997 to draft Marc Woolnough with their second selection and Matthew Scarlett with their third-round pick, whilst Collingwood chose to not select Marcus Picken. In 2001, the rule was changed to only allow a single selection per year, costing the club a third-round selection. Notably, this rule allowed Geelong to draft Gary Ablett Jr. (who, while only rated a mid-range draft possibility at the time, went on to win two Brownlow Medals) to the club in 2001 using only their third-round (40th overall) draft pick. In 2003, the rules were changed again to allow multiple players to be drafted in a single year, with a third-round selection used for the first player and a second-round selection being used for the second player. Collingwood drafted cousins Brayden and Heath Shaw using their second- and third-round selection, respectively, in 2003.

Bidding system 
In 2007, following concerns that potential first-round draftees were being selected for an unfairly low draft pick under the father–son rule, a bidding system was established to ensure father–son recruits could still be preferentially drafted by the father's club, albeit at a fair market value. Under the 2007 amendment, any club could bid on another club's son with one of its draft picks, and the father's club then had the right to recruit the son by giving up its next pick. The bidding process occurred prior to the draft, but the decisions made while bidding were binding during the draft. For example, in 2008 the Western Bulldogs used their first-round selection to secure Ayce Cordy after St Kilda bid its higher first-round selection for him.

The bidding system was further refined in 2015. Under the current system:
Each draft pick is assigned a value (with No. 1 starting at 3000 points, declining exponentially until No. 74 which has no value), which is regressed from historical player salary data.
During the draft, any club may bid for a father–son eligible player with any draft pick.
The father's club, if it wishes to select the son, must then use its next one or more draft picks until the total points value of the surrendered picks adds up to the value of the draft pick used by the bidding, less a discount – which is either 20% of the bid value or 197 points (equivalent to pick No. 56), whichever is greater. Any points left over after reaching the bid value result in the draft pick being shuffled down the order.
The club which originally made the bid then has the next selection in the draft.
The same bidding process has also been used since 2015 by the New South Wales and Queensland clubs to gain access to their states' academy players.

Player eligibility
As of March 2011, eligibility of players differs depending upon the home-state of the team making the selection.

All clubs
A player is eligible if his father played 100 or more senior games for the clubs. In the cases of the two interstate clubs with historic links to Victorian Football League teams, namely the Brisbane Lions and the Sydney Swans, the sons of players who appeared 100 times for their Victorian predecessors: the Fitzroy Lions in the case of the Brisbane Lions; and the South Melbourne Football Club in the case of the Sydney Swans.

West Australian and South Australian teams
In addition to the standard eligibility rules, the South Australian and Western Australian clubs have a modified rule in place with eligibility to be determined by a certain number of games played for specific sides in SANFL or WAFL, if those games were played prior to the club entering the AFL. Specifically:
The West Coast Eagles could select any player whose father had made 150 WAFL appearances prior to 1987 for Claremont, East Perth, West Perth or Subiaco.
Adelaide could select any player whose father made 200 SANFL appearances prior to 1991 for South Adelaide, Norwood, Glenelg or Sturt.
Fremantle could select any player whose father has made 150 WAFL appearances prior to 1995 for East Fremantle, South Fremantle, Perth or Swan Districts.
Port Adelaide can select any player whose father has made 200 SANFL appearances prior to 1997 for the Port Adelaide Magpies, North Adelaide, West Adelaide, Central District, Woodville or West Torrens.

Until 2006 these rules would only apply during the first 20 years of the club's existence in the AFL.  This 20-year provision was removed because it was felt to be unfair if a player had a son later in life.

These rules have been frequently criticised by non-Victorian AFL club officials as a "grandfather–son" rule that is biased against them. For example, the Adelaide Crows have not had a single father–son selection in 21 years, and missed out on Bryce Gibbs despite his father's 253-game career with SANFL club Glenelg from 1984 to 1994. Gibbs was subsequently selected by Carlton with the first overall pick in the 2006 AFL Draft.

Former eligibility rules
Neither of these rules is in place as of 2012.

More than one eligible team and player choice
If a player is eligible to be selected by more than one team the individual player may choose which one of these teams is able to pick him under this rule. For example, Joe Daniher's father Anthony Daniher played 118 games with Essendon and 115 with Sydney. Joe selected Essendon.

Alternatively, a player has the right to decline to be selected under the father–son rule and instead be eligible to be drafted by any other club. An example of this was Marc Murphy who declined to sign with the Brisbane Lions despite his father, John Murphy, playing 214 games for the Fitzroy Football Club. Murphy was instead selected as the first pick in the 2005 National Draft by Carlton.

AFL Women's
With the establishment of AFL Women's from the 2017 season, the AFL introduced an equivalent father–daughter recruitment rule, enabling clubs priority recruitment access to daughters of former senior players. Under this rule, the father needs to only have played one senior match for his club for his daughter to be eligible. 

The first father-daughter selection was in 2018, when Carlton selected Abbie McKay, the daughter of Andrew McKay.

Criteria are also in place for mother–son and mother–daughter rules, from such time that the children of AFLW players reach draft eligible age (i.e. at least 18 years of age on 31 December in the year in which they are drafted).

See also
List of players drafted to the Australian Football League under the father–son rule
AFL Draft

References

Australian Football League
Australian Football League draft
Australian rules football families